Carlstedt is a surname. Notable people with the surname include:

 Birger Carlstedt (1907–1975), Finnish painter
 Claudia Carlstedt (1878–1953), American actress and singer
 Lily Carlstedt (1926–2002), Danish javelin thrower